Low Country Blues is the seventh studio album by Gregg Allman, and the last studio album to be released during his lifetime. It was produced by T Bone Burnett, and was released through Rounder Records on January 18, 2011. The album reached No. 5 on the Billboard 200 and No. 1 on the Top Blues Albums charts, making it Allman's highest-charting album. It was nominated for a 2011 Grammy Award for Best Blues Album.

Track listing
"Floating Bridge" (John Adam Estes) – 4:45  
"Little by Little" (Melvin London) – 2:45  
"Devil Got My Woman" (Nehemiah "Skip" James) – 4:52 
"I Can't Be Satisfied" (Muddy Waters) – 3:31  
"Blind Man" (Don D. Robey, Joseph Wade Scott) – 3:46  
"Just Another Rider" (Gregg Allman, Warren Haynes) – 5:39  
"Please Accept My Love" (B.B. King, Sam Ling) – 3:07
"I Believe I'll Go Back Home" (Traditional, arranged by Gregg Allman and T Bone Burnett) – 3:49  
"Tears, Tears, Tears" (Amos Milburn) – 4:54
"My Love Is Your Love" (Samuel Maghett) – 4:14
"Checking on My Baby" (Otis Rush) – 4:06
"Rolling Stone" (Traditional, arranged by Gregg Allman, T Bone Burnett and Mac Rebennack) – 7:04

Personnel
Gregg Allman – vocals, B3, acoustic guitar
Doyle Bramhall II – guitar 
T Bone Burnett – producer, guitar on 1, 4, 6, 7, 8, 11
Hadley Hawkensmith – guitar on "Floating Bridge" 
Vincent Esquer – guitar on "Just Another Rider"
Mike Compton – mandolin, background vocals on "I Believe I'll go Back Home"
Colin Linden – dobro on "Devil Got My Woman", "Rolling Stone"
Dennis Crouch – double bass
Dr. John – piano
Jay Bellerose – drums, percussion
Lester Lovitt – trumpet on "Blind Man"
Daniel Fornero – trumpet on "Blind Man"
Joseph Sublett – tenor saxophone on 5, 6, 7, 9, 11
Thomas Peterson – baritone saxophone on 5, 6, 7, 9, 11
Jim Thompson – tenor saxophone on 5, 6, 7, 9, 11
Darrell Leonard – horn arrangements on 5, 6, 7, 9, 11, bass trumpet on 6, 7, 9, 11 trumpet on 7, 9, 11 
Judith Hill – background vocals on "My Love Is Your Love"
Alfie Silas-Durio – background vocals on "My Love Is Your Love"
Tata Vega – background vocals on "My Love Is Your Love"
Jean Witherspoon – background vocals on "My Love Is Your Love"
Bill Maxwell – background vocals arrangements on "My Love Is Your Love"

Additional personnel 
Ivy Skoff – production coordination
Gavin Lurssen – mastering
Mike Piersante – engineer, mixing
Vanessa Parr – 2nd engineer
Zachary Dawes – 2nd engineer
Kyle Ford – 2nd engineer
Jason Wormer – editing
Emile Kelman – editing
Paul Ackling – guitar technician
Danny Clinch – photography
Larissa Collins – art direction, design

Charts

Weekly charts

Year-end charts

References

2011 albums
Gregg Allman albums
Albums produced by T Bone Burnett
Rounder Records albums